The 1796 State of the Union Address was given by George Washington, the first president of the United States, on Wednesday, December 7, 1796. It was given in Congress Hall, Philadelphia. He gave it directly to Congress. He began with, "In recurring to the internal situation of our country since I had last the pleasure to address you, I find ample reason for a renewed expression of that gratitude to the Ruler of the Universe which a continued series of prosperity has so often and so justly called forth."   He ended with, "God's providential care may still be extended to the United States, that the virtue and happiness of the people may be preserved, and that the Government which they have instituted for the protection of their liberties may be perpetual."

References

State of the Union addresses
Presidency of George Washington
State of the Union Address
State of the Union Address
State of the Union Address
Speeches by George Washington
4th United States Congress
State of the Union